The Teibel–Sykora Rubblestone Barn is a historic barn located in Tabor, South Dakota. The house was constructed circa 1900. It was added  to the National Register of Historic Places on July 6, 1987, as part of a "Thematic Nomination of Czech Folk Architecture of Southeastern South Dakota".

See also
National Register of Historic Places listings in Bon Homme County, South Dakota

References

Barns on the National Register of Historic Places in South Dakota
Buildings and structures in Tabor, South Dakota
Czech-American culture in South Dakota
Barns in South Dakota
National Register of Historic Places in Bon Homme County, South Dakota